The 1913 County Championship was the twenty-fourth officially organised running of the County Championship. Kent County Cricket Club won their fourth championship title.

Table
 Five points were awarded for a win.
 Three points were awarded for "winning" the first innings of a drawn match.
 One point was awarded for "losing" the first innings of a drawn match.
 Final placings were decided by calculating the percentage of * possible points.
 Final placings were decided by calculating the percentage of possible points.

References

1913 in English cricket
County Championship seasons
County